The women's artistic team all-around competition, one of six events for female competitors in artistic gymnastics at the 1960 Summer Olympics in Rome, was held at the Baths of Caracalla from 6 to 8 September. It was the 6th appearance of the event.

Competition format

The gymnastics all-around events continued to use the aggregation format, though the team portable apparatus component was eliminated. Each nation entered a team of six gymnasts. All entrants in the gymnastics competitions performed both a compulsory exercise and a voluntary exercise for each apparatus. The top five individual scores in each exercise (that is, compulsory floor, voluntary floor, compulsory vault, etc.) were added to give a team score for that exercise. The 8 team exercise scores were summed to give a team total. 

No separate finals were contested for the all-around events, though separate apparatus finals were added.

Exercise scores ranged from 0 to 10, apparatus scores from 0 to 20, individual totals from 0 to 80, and team scores from 0 to 400.

Results

References

 Official Olympic Report
 GymnasticsResults.com: Olympic results
 Gymn-Forum.net: Olympic results

Women's artistic team all-around
Women's events at the 1960 Summer Olympics